Euseius elinae is a species of mite in the family Phytoseiidae.

References

elinae
Articles created by Qbugbot
Animals described in 1977